Zhang Xiangsen (Chinese: 张祥森; born November 5, 1972) is a male weightlifter from China. He competed at the 1996 Atlanta Olympics and won a silver medal in the men's 56kg division.

References
sports-reference

Living people
1972 births
Chinese male weightlifters
Olympic weightlifters of China
Olympic silver medalists for China
Weightlifters at the 1996 Summer Olympics
Olympic medalists in weightlifting
Medalists at the 1996 Summer Olympics
World Weightlifting Championships medalists
20th-century Chinese people